Jennifer Klein is an American professor of 20th century U.S. history at Yale University. Klein's work specializes in social history and the history of healthcare provision.

She graduated from Barnard College, and from the University of Virginia. She is a professor at Yale University. She is Senior Editor of International Labor and Working Class History.

Awards and honors
Klein has won an Ellis W. Hawley Prize, the Hans Sigrist Prize, and the Sara A. Whaley prize.

Works

References

External links
 millercenter.org
 transatlantica.revues.org
 Speaking of Women: interview with Jennifer Klein (interview by Binnie Klein & Rhea Hirschman)
 Belaboured podcast interview with Eileen Boris

Living people
University of Virginia alumni
Barnard College alumni
Yale University faculty
American medical historians
Year of birth missing (living people)